Chibuzor Aloysius Nwogbo (born 31 October 1990 in Nigeria) is a Nigerian footballer.

Career

After playing for Northern Cypriot club Cihangir GSK as well as University of Pretoria in the South African second division, Nwogbo signed for Turkish fifth division side Nevşehir Belediyespor, where he scored 12 goals in his first 9 league appearances, with at least 1 every game. From there, he played for Utaş Uşakspor and 1954 Kelkit Belediyespor in the Turkish fifth division.

References

External links
 Chibuzor Nwogbo at TFF

1990 births
Living people
Sportspeople from Jos
Nigerian footballers
Association football forwards
Adanaspor footballers
University of Pretoria F.C. players
Nigerian expatriate footballers
Expatriate soccer players in South Africa
Nigerian expatriate sportspeople in South Africa
Expatriate footballers in Turkey
Nigerian expatriate sportspeople in Turkey
Expatriate footballers in Northern Cyprus
Nigerian expatriate sportspeople in Northern Cyprus